Didam railway station is located in Didam, Netherlands. The station was opened on 15 July 1885 and is located on the Winterswijk–Zevenaar railway line. The station is operated by Arriva and Breng and they use trains with Diesel engines.

Train services

Bus services

External links
NS website 
Dutch Public Transport journey planner 

Railway stations in Gelderland
Railway stations opened in 1885
Montferland
1885 establishments in the Netherlands
Railway stations in the Netherlands opened in the 19th century